The fourth season of American crime-comedy-drama television series Castle was ordered on January 10, 2011, by ABC. The season aired from September 19, 2011, to May 7, 2012. The fourth season initially contained 22 episodes, but on December 8, 2011, ABC ordered an additional episode, bringing the total episode count to 23 episodes. Penny Johnson Jerald joined the cast as the new captain, Victoria "Iron" Gates for the fourth season.

Overview
Richard Castle (Fillion) is a famous mystery novelist who has killed off the main character in his popular book series and has writer's block. He is brought in by the NYPD for questioning regarding a copy-cat murder based on one of his novels. He is intrigued by this new window into crime and murder, and uses his connection with the mayor to charm his way into shadowing Detective Kate Beckett (Katic). Castle decides to use Beckett as his muse for Nikki Heat, the main character of his next book series. Beckett, an avid reader of Castle's books, initially disapproves of having Castle shadow her work, but later warms up and recognizes Castle as a useful resource in her team's investigations.

Cast

Main cast
 Nathan Fillion as Richard Castle
 Stana Katic as Dt. Kate Beckett
 Jon Huertas as Dt. Javier Esposito
 Seamus Dever as Dt. Kevin Ryan
 Tamala Jones as Dr. Lanie Parish
 Molly C. Quinn as Alexis Castle
 Susan Sullivan as Martha Rodgers
 Penny Johnson Jerald as Captain Victoria Gates

Recurring cast
 Victor Webster as Josh Davidson 
 Scott Paulin as Jim Beckett 
 Michael Dorn as Dr. Carter Burke
 Juliana Dever as Jenny Duffy-O'Malley

Guest cast
 Geoff Pierson as Mr. Smith 
 Juliana Dever as Jenny 
 Derek Webster as Mayor Robert Weldon 
 Jennifer Beals as Sophia Conrad 
 Josh Stamberg as Martin Danberg 
 David Chisum as Thomas Gage 
 Lorin McCraley as West Side Wally
 Meghan Markle as Charlotte Boyd
 Adam Baldwin as Dt. Ethan Slaughter

Episodes

Reception

Critical reception
The fourth season of Castle received positive reviews from critics, many of whom was pleased that the show finally united Fillion and Katic's characters Castle and Beckett after having four seasons of on-again-off-again relationship. Sandra Gonzalez from Entertainment Weekly was pleased in the way the relationship happened.

DVD release

Awards and nominations

References

2011 American television seasons
2012 American television seasons
Season 4